The 1911–12 City Cup was the eighteenth edition of the City Cup, a cup competition in Irish football.

The tournament was won by Glentoran for the fourth time and second consecutive year. 

Not all the matches were played due to a dispute between clubs and the Irish Football Association which meant Linfield were excluded from matches after February 1912 and had to complete their matches under the name Belfast Blues. Additionally, Derry Celtic forfeited three of their matches.

Group standings

References

1911–12 in Irish association football